The Bagvalal language (Bagulal) is an Avar–Andic language spoken by the Bagvalals in southwestern Dagestan, Russia, along the right bank of the river Andi-Koisu and the surrounding hills, near the Georgian border. It is fairly similar to Tindi, its closest relative. The 2010 Russian census recorded 1,450 Bagvalal speakers.

The tradition and culture of the Bagvalal people is very similar to that of the Avar people, due to their common history within the Avar Khanate.

Bagvalal has three dialects which are named after the names of the villages in which they are spoken in. Only the Tlisi dialect has been studied to a certain significance, because of its similarities to the Tindi language.

Bagvalal has numerous loanwords from such languages as Arabic, Russian, Turkish, and Avar. It is only used as an oral language; Avar or Russian are used as written languages. Nowadays Bagvalal is only used in family settings, using Avar or Russian for every other area of communication.

Bagvalal has been suffering severe problems and is in serious danger of extinction. The schooling and cultural revolution have contributed to Bagvalal's serious decline. Bagvalal pupils are taught in Avar in primary school, and in secondary school they are taught in Russian. Between 1950 and 1970, Bagvalals migrated to different districts in the Astrakhan province of Russia, and this also affected the Bagvalal language.

Despite this, most of the Bagvalal are supportive towards the language, and around 30~50% of children are fluent in the language.

Bagvalal was first mentioned in the 19th century, but very few recordings of the language have been made. There has been very little linguistic research done on the language.

References

External links 
The peoples of the Red Book: Bagulals

Northeast Caucasian languages
Andic languages
Languages of Russia
Endangered Caucasian languages